Amy Willerton (born 18 August 1992) is an English television presenter, model and beauty pageant titleholder. She is best known for her work with ITV and winning the title of Miss Universe Great Britain and representing Great Britain at the Miss Universe 2013 pageant. She got her big modelling break when she was discovered by Katie Price as a teenager. She appeared on the reality TV competition series I'm a Celebrity... Get Me Out of Here! in 2013 and finished in fifth place. In 2015, she was placed fourteenth in FHM's 100 Sexiest Women. In 2017, she placed fourth in Channel 4's The Jump.

Early life and education
Willerton was born in Bristol, England to parents Bruce and Sarah. She has two siblings, Erin Willerton and Ross Willerton who is severely disabled. The family communicates with Ross using Makaton sign language. She is a direct descendant of the Catholic Church cardinal Thomas Wolsey.

She attended Cotham School before completing her A levels at North Bristol Post 16 Centre. She was due to study Media at University in Cardiff before deferring to pursue her modelling career.

Modelling career
Willerton began her modelling career at the age of 15 after being scouted whilst out shopping with her sister. She has since appeared on catwalks around the world for brands such as Karen Millen and Guess (clothing) in advertising campaigns such as being the face of Sure.

Pageants

Miss Bristol 2010, Miss Bath 2011, Miss London 2012
At age 17, Willerton won Miss Bristol. She went on to win Miss Bath in 2011 and Miss London in 2012. At the Miss England contest in 2012, Willerton reached the top five.

Miss Asia Pacific World 2011
The events were filmed by Willerton and other contestants (which were later uploaded to YouTube under the title Confessions of a Beauty Queen and spread throughout the pageant industry). Subsequently, she and the representatives from Guyana and Costa Rica fled their hotel to the airport, where the pageant organisers had tried to keep them there against their will and had followed them to the airport to stop them escaping. Organisers denied the accusations.

Miss Universe 2013
On 8 June 2013, Willerton was crowned Miss Universe Great Britain in Birmingham and was quickly tipped as a potential winner of Miss Universe by international media and pageant forums. On 9 November 2013, Willerton participated at the Miss Universe contest in Moscow, Russia, where she became the first woman competing as Miss Great Britain to place in the semifinals, eventually finishing in the Top 10. Previous British contestants have placed as 1st Runner-up at Miss Universe, competing as Miss England, Miss Scotland and Miss Wales respectively. Willerton is the first British contestant in thirty years to reach the top ten at Miss Universe, the previous woman to achieve this being Karen Moore, who as Miss England, reached the top five in 1983.

Television career
Less than 24 hours after landing into London from filming the Miss Universe pageant in Moscow, Willerton flew to Australia to compete on ITV's I'm a Celebrity...Get Me Out of Here! and placed fifth.

She appeared on This Morning, Good Morning Britain, Big Brother's Bit on the Side, The Chase, Mastermind and Lorraine. In 2015, she appeared on Get Your Act Together, which involved her joining and performing with the Moscow State Circus.

Willerton based herself in the USA in 2016, and began hosting for Fuse TV Network alongside DJ Skee. She then was selected to host the Dance on Network show Every Single Step working with industry legends Nigel Lythgoe and Brian Friedman. The show's close similarity to So You Think You Can Dance caused many comparisons between Amy and fellow British presenter Cat Deeley. She was a contestant on The Jump in February 2017 and finished in third place.

Philanthropy and other ventures
Willerton's charitable work has focused on helping the disabled. She organised her first event, Bristol Rockstyle for the Variety Club children's charity as a teenager. In 2014 she ran the London Marathon to raise money for The Chickenshed Theatre School.

In 2015, Willerton began writing for the Huffington Post. She was a speaker at the Oxford Union debating society at the University of Oxford.

In the summer of 2016, Willerton sailed across the Atlantic from New York to London as part of the Clipper Round the World Yacht Race.

Personal life
In March 2019, Willerton became engaged to her partner, Daniel Day, and in January 2020, they had their first child together.

References

External links 

 

Living people
Miss Universe 2013 contestants
Models from Bristol
1992 births
Television personalities from Bristol
English female models
English beauty pageant winners
I'm a Celebrity...Get Me Out of Here! (British TV series) participants
21st-century English women